Florina Paşcalău (born January 19, 1982,  in Cluj-Napoca) is a Romanian professional female basketball player who plays for the Romanian club CSM Târgovişte in the Women's EuroLeague. As a member of the senior Romanian national basketball team, she competed at the 2007 EuroBasket. Paşcalău is the first Romanian who has played in the WNBA.

References

External links
 Profile at Eurobasket.com

1982 births
Living people
Centers (basketball)
Club Sportiv Municipal Târgoviște players
Sportspeople from Cluj-Napoca
Romanian expatriate basketball people in the United States
Romanian women's basketball players
Seattle Storm players